The Red Star Lodge and Sawmill, also known as the Shoshone Lodge, is a dude ranch in Shoshone National Forest near the east entrance to Yellowstone National Park. Built between 1924 and 1950, the ranch includes a rustic log lodge surrounded by cabins and support buildings. What is now called the Shoshone Lodge is the most intact example of a dude ranch operation in the area.

History
The lodge was built by Henry Dahlem, the first sheriff of Park County, Wyoming, beginning in 1924 and progressing by stages. The second quarter of the lodge was built in 1930, the third in 1935, and the final quarter in 1944. The lodge and other structures were built of D-shaped milled logs, produced on site at the Star Sawmill. Henry's son Harry took over management of the ranch in 1949 at a time when the Forest Service called the operation "Shoshone Lodge." Harry died in 1954, and his wife Betty managed the lodge with the help of their children Keith and Deborah. Keith Dahlem operates the nearby Sleeping Giant Ski Resort in the winter, while the Shoshone Lodge is open during the summer.

Description
The irregularly shaped grand lodge is a two-story log structure set on a stone foundation. The east half of the building is built of hand-peeled round logs, while the west portion uses D-shaped milled logs produced on site. The lodge's roof is very complex, a result of the many additions. The main lodge is surrounded by guest cabins, employee dormitories and service buildings.

References

External links
 at the National Park Service's NRHP database
Red Star Lodge and Sawmill at the Wyoming State Historic Preservation Office

Buildings and structures in Park County, Wyoming
Dude ranches in Wyoming
Industrial buildings and structures on the National Register of Historic Places in Wyoming
Ranches on the National Register of Historic Places in Wyoming
Rustic architecture in Wyoming
Shoshone National Forest
Sawmills in the United States
Historic districts on the National Register of Historic Places in Wyoming
National Register of Historic Places in Park County, Wyoming
1924 establishments in Wyoming